De Mora is a surname. Notable persons with that name include:

 Francisco de Mora ( 1553–1610), Spanish architect
 Jaime de Mora y Aragón (1925–1995), Spanish aristocrat and actor
 José de Mora (1642–1724), Spanish sculptor
 Juan Gómez de Mora (1586–1648), Spanish architect
 Miguel Gil Moreno de Mora (1967–2000), Spanish cameraman and war correspondent
 Doña Fabiola de Mora y Aragón (1928–2014), Spanish nobility, former Queen of Belgium

See also 
 Mora (disambiguation)
 De la Mora